The Troubleshooters (titled Mogul for the first series) is a British television series made by the BBC between 1965 and 1972, created by John Elliot. It recounted events in an international oil company – the "Mogul" of the title. The first series was mostly concerned with the internal politics within the Mogul organisation, with episodes revolving around industrial espionage, internal fraud and negligence almost leading to an accident on a North Sea oil rig.

The series' upbeat theme music was by Tom Springfield, brother of Dusty.

Cast
Brian Stead (Geoffrey Keen 1965–72), Mogul's tough Deputy Managing Director.
Peter Thornton (Ray Barrett 1965–72), company field agent (i.e. "troubleshooter").
Alec Stewart (Robert Hardy 1966–70), ruthlessly ambitious "troubleshooter" keen to rise up the promotional ladder.
Willy Izard (Philip Latham 1965–72), head of finance at Mogul.
Robert Driscoll (Barry Foster 1965), Mogul's head of public relations.
Derek Prentice (Ronald Hines 1965), head of personnel at Mogul.
Jane Webb (Philippa Gail 1965–66, 1970–71), Stead's efficient secretary.
Eileen O'Rourke (Isobel Black 1967–68), ambitious public relations assistant at Mogul.
"Steve" Thornton (Justine Lord 1965–66, 1968), glamorous woman unhappily married to troubleshooter Peter Thornton.
Roz Stewart (Deborah Stanford 1966–70), Alec Stewart's wife, keen to strike out in business on her own, opening a London boutique.
James Langley (John Carson 1971–72)
Dr. Ginny Vickers (Jayne Sofiano 1967–69)
Charles Grandmercy (Edward de Souza 1967–68)
Joan Izard (Margaret Ward 1965, 1967, 1969, 1971)
Julie Serres (Virginia Wetherell 1967)
Miss Jenkins (Beryl Cooke 1970–71)

The Troubleshooters
Although Mogul was popular, it did not do as well as hoped for. However, it was renewed for a second series with the format radically changed. The show was renamed The Troubleshooters and it altered its focus, broadening its horizons by showing the actual workings of the company. The series now focused on the younger, dynamic Mogul field agents - the eponymous "troubleshooters" - like Peter Thornton, who flew around the world to "hotspots" to protect the company's interests.

Storylines

The show's storylines concentrated on disasters such as explosions and earthquakes, company take-overs, racial and political tensions, the discovery of new oil fields and the negotiation of drilling rights. There was extensive use of stock footage of locations.

As time went on, The Troubleshooters began to experiment with ongoing narratives as storylines arched over several series. Because of the nature of his profession requiring him to be away from home, Peter Thornton found his marriage to the glamorous Steve collapsing. Brian Stead was diagnosed with a heart condition, and he struggled to maintain control of Mogul at the top. Ranged against him was new "troubleshooter" Alec Stewart, a young, ruthless operative keen to progress in the organisation with his eye on Stead's position. Stead kept sending Stewart out on dangerous assignments in the hope that he would fail, but Stewart was able to work every situation to his advantage. In the latter series, a rival oil company to Mogul was introduced – Zenith.

The Troubleshooters never shied away from portraying Mogul as a faceless, uncaring and profit-driven corporation. Some episodes showcased industrial crisis through the perspective of striking Teesside dockyard workers and foregrounded ecological concerns through storylines about local opposition to a Mogul refinery in Wales and a chemical offshoot of Mogul's, which developed a crop spray with deadly side effects. There was also no loyalty or sentimentality amongst the Mogul men – Peter Thornton, sent to the Arctic by Brian Stead to investigate possible oil concessions, nearly freezes to death and considers getting out of the oil business entirely. In another episode, Thornton is sent to Saigon, against the backdrop of the Vietnam war. Alec Stewart is arrested in Algiers as a spy and imprisoned – although eventually released, he receives little trust or support from his colleagues. Brian Stead, returning to Berlin for the first time since 1945 to oversee a natural gas drilling deal, finds his past coming back to haunt him in a nasty plot to discredit him by a rival company.

The Troubleshooters and the real-life oil industry

The Mogul organisation was reputed to have been based on BP and there were many similarities and coincidences in terms of the international events The Troubleshooters predicted.

 BP struck oil in Alaska and three days later, Mogul did the same on television. However, this particular episode had been produced four months earlier.
 In another episode, Mogul took over a chemical company – and BP did the same a few days later.
 The Troubleshooters predicted that there would be a channel tunnel and also that men would live in underwater houses to probe the seabed for oil. Both predictions came true.
 An episode was made that showed an explosion in the North Sea, just before a real-life explosion occurred, and the RAF was forced to set fire to the sea as warning to shipping.
 The series also predicted to within 0.1 of a penny, the price that oil companies would charge the Gas Council for North Sea gas.
 Lead actor Geoffrey Keen, who played Brian Stead, even found himself invited to the Oil Industries Club dinner, where he was warmly greeted by his "fellow" executives.

Conclusion
The Troubleshooters lasted for seven series from 1965 to 1972, making the transition from black-and-white to colour along the way. In the final episodes, Brian Stead maintains control of Mogul and fends off hostile enemies, but at the cost of his own health. Stead eventually steps down as company director, but not before finally naming his successor.

Today the legacy of The Troubleshooters lies in its bridging the gap between "quality drama" and populist entertainment and charting a linear path trod by later British television serials, such as The Brothers and Howards' Way. The series struck a chord with the 1960s audience thanks to its format - a potent combination of the oil business, globe trotting power politics, corporate wheeler-dealing and sex. It had parallels with the contemporaneous ATV board-room drama The Plane Makers (later renamed The Power Game).

Archive status
The series was subject to the BBC's wiping policy of the era, but some episodes still remain in the BBC archive, including the series opener "Kelly's Eye". Only one colour episode survives as broadcast ("Camelot on a Clear Day", a copy of which can be viewed at the National Media Museum in Bradford, UK); all other existing colour episodes only survive in the form of black-and-white film recordings.

A previously missing episode from series two - "Birdstrike" - was returned to the BBC by a private collector in May 2010, with the assistance of classic TV organisation Kaleidoscope.

DVD release
The five surviving episodes of series one were released on DVD in the UK by Danann Publishing Ltd. in 2016.

Notes

External links

British Film Institute Screen Online
Mogul & The Troubleshooters Appreciation Site
BBC Treasure Hunt

BBC television dramas
1960s British drama television series
1970s British drama television series
Lost BBC episodes
Television shows written by John Elliot (author)
1965 British television series debuts
1972 British television series endings
Black-and-white British television shows
English-language television shows